Thermoniphas togara, the bright chalk blue, is a butterfly in the family Lycaenidae. It is found in Nigeria, Cameroon, Gabon, the Republic of the Congo, the Central African Republic, the Democratic Republic of the Congo and Uganda. The habitat consists of forest edges.

Subspecies
Thermoniphas togara togara (eastern Nigeria, Cameroon, Gabon, Congo, Central African Republic, Uganda, Democratic Republic of the Congo: Mayumbe, Mongala, Uele, Ituri, Tshopo, Tshuapa, Equateur and Lualaba)
Thermoniphas togara bugalla Stempffer & Jackson, 1962 (Uganda: Sesse Islands in Lake Victoria)

References

Butterflies described in 1880
Thermoniphas
Butterflies of Africa